The Colonial Exposition Issue was the first omnibus issue of the French colonial empire. Issued in 1931, in conjunction with the Paris Colonial Exposition, it consisted of four different engraved designs, denominated in the local currency. 26 French territories participated.

The four designs had themes reflecting those of the exposition:

 People of the French empire (green)
 Women's heads (violet)
 An allegory of France showing the way to civilization (red orange)
 Colonial commerce, with natives holding their wares, and a steamship in the background (blue)

Stamp inscriptions read "Exposition Coloniale Internationale Paris 1931". The designs were identical for all territories, differing only in currency, and the name of the territory, which was printed in black.   France also issued stamps for the Colonial Exposition, but with different designs.

Participating colonies 

 French Cameroon
 French Chad
 French Dahomey
 French Guiana
 French Guinea
 French India
 French Polynesia
 French Sudan
 Gabon
 Guadeloupe
 French Indochina
 Ivory Coast
 French Madagascar
 Martinique
 Mauritania
 Middle Congo
 New Caledonia
 Niger
 Oubangui-Chari
 Réunion
 St. Pierre & Miquelon
 Senegal
 French Somali Coast
 French Togo
 Upper Volta
 Wallis and Futuna Islands

References 
 Scott catalogue

World's fair commemorative stamps
Postage stamps of France
Paris Colonial Exposition